Key’vantanie "Keke" Coutee (born January 14, 1997) is an American football wide receiver who is a free agent. He played college football at Texas Tech.

Early years
Coutee attended Lufkin High School in Lufkin, Texas. As a senior at Lufkin, he caught 56 passes for 841 yards. Coutee originally committed in June 2013 to play college football for the Texas Longhorns, but he de-committed in January 2014. He then committed to the Texas Tech Red Raiders in January 2015. He committed to Texas Tech over Oklahoma, Texas, Louisville, Houston, and Tulsa.

College career
As a true freshman at Texas Tech, Coutee played in all 13 games, making two starts, catching 11 passes for 105 yards.

Coutee broke out as a sophomore in 2016. He played in all 12 of Texas Tech's games, catching 55 passes for 890 yards and seven touchdowns, making him Texas Tech's second-leading receiver.

Coutee's breakout as a Red Raider continued as a junior in 2017. In 13 games, he caught 93 passes for 1,429 yards and 10 touchdowns, plus a 92-yard kick return against Baylor. Coutee's 1,429 receiving yards ranks second in school history for a single season behind Michael Crabtree's 1,962 in 2007. After the season, Coutee declared for the 2018 NFL Draft.

College statistics

Source:

Professional career

Houston Texans
Coutee was drafted by the Houston Texans in the fourth round with the 103rd overall pick in the 2018 NFL Draft. The team signed Coutee on May 11 to a four-year contract.

Coutee missed the first three games of the 2018 season with a hamstring injury. Coutee made his NFL debut in week 4 against the Indianapolis Colts. He finished the game with 11 receptions for 109 yards. Coutee's 11 receptions are the most receptions in a debut since the AFL–NFL merger. On Sunday Night Football, in a 19–16 overtime victory over the Dallas Cowboys in Week 5, Coutee caught his first NFL touchdown on a one-yard pass from Deshaun Watson. He finished the game with six receptions for 51 yards and a touchdown.

In Week 13 of the 2020 season against the Indianapolis Colts, Coutee recorded eight catches for 141 yards during the 26–20 loss. In week 15 of the 2020 season against the Indianapolis Colts, Coutee had 5 receptions for 53 receiving yards and a touchdown. He also fumbled on the goal line in the closing seconds of the game, which allowed the Colts to take over and kneel out the clock.

On August 31, 2021, Coutee was waived by the Texans.

Indianapolis Colts
On September 2, 2021, Coutee signed with the Indianapolis Colts practice squad. He signed a reserve/future contract on January 10, 2022.

On August 30, 2022, Coutee was released by the Colts and signed to the practice squad the next day. He was signed to the active roster on October 15, 2022. He was released on December 13, 2022 and later re-signed to the practice squad.  His practice squad contract with the team expired after the season on January 8, 2023.

NFL career statistics

Regular season

Postseason

References

External links
Texas Tech Red Raiders bio
Houston Texans bio

1997 births
Living people
People from Lufkin, Texas
Players of American football from Texas
American football wide receivers
Texas Tech Red Raiders football players
Houston Texans players
Indianapolis Colts players